Bernard Leslie Sparkes (born October 15, 1940) is a former world champion curler.

Sparkes's first major curling championship success came when he won the 1957 Alberta Schoolboys. He would later go on to win 4 Alberta (1966, 1967, 1968, 1969) championships and 3 Canadian Brier and World Championships (1966, 1968, 1969) He was voted all star second at 4 consecutive Briers as the second for the Ron Northcott team. He is a member of the Lethbridge Sports Hall Of Fame (baseball), the Southern Alberta Curling Hall Of Fame, the Canadian Curling Hall of Fame (1974) and the WCF Hall of Fame (2021). Sparkes moved to British Columbia in 1970 and went on to win 9 more men's provincial curling championships 1 Masters over 70 in 2014 and 1 mixed championship. He was elected to the B.C. Sports Hall Of Fame in 1995. He was elected to the World Curling Hall of Fame in 2021. 

One of his leisurely pursuits is painting. He paints still life and animal paintings. One of his most famous paintings is a chair in a lawn, surrounded by bouquets and flowers. 

At the time of the 1967 Brier, he was a stationary salesman. He was an avid baseball player in his youth, and was a member of the Brooklyn Dodgers organization.

Notes

External links

 Bernie Sparkes – Curling Canada Stats Archive
 Video:  (channel «Curling Canada»)

Curlers from British Columbia
Curlers from Alberta
Living people
1940 births
World curling champions
Brier champions
Canadian male curlers
Canadian baseball players